This is a list of the members elected to the 32nd Dáil Éireann, the lower house of the Oireachtas (legislature) of Ireland. These TDs (members of parliament) were elected at the 2016 general election on 26 February. That general election took place throughout the state to elect 158 members of Dáil Éireann, a reduction of 8 from the prior number of 166. This followed the passing of the Electoral (Amendment) (Dáil Constituencies) Act 2013.

The 32nd Dáil convened for the first time at 10.30 am on 10 March 2016. Its first act was to elect a Ceann Comhairle. It was dissolved by President Michael D. Higgins on the request of Taoiseach Leo Varadkar on 14 January 2020. The 32nd Dáil lasted  days.

Composition of the 32nd Dáil

Government party denoted with bulletParty giving confidence and supply denoted by C.

Notes

Leadership

 Ceann Comhairle: Seán Ó Fearghaíl (Fianna Fáil)
 Leas-Cheann Comhairle: Pat "the Cope" Gallagher (Fianna Fáil)

Government

 Taoiseach 
 Enda Kenny (6 May 2016 – 14 June 2017)
 Leo Varadkar (14 June 2017 – 14 January 2020)
 Tánaiste
Frances Fitzgerald (6 May 2016 – 28 November 2017)
Simon Coveney (30 November 2017 – 14 January 2020)

Opposition
Opposition Front Bench
Leader of the Opposition and Leader of Fianna Fáil: Micheál Martin
Fianna Fáil Chief whip: Michael Moynihan
Leader of Sinn Féin: Gerry Adams , Mary Lou McDonald 
Sinn Féin Chief Whip: Aengus Ó Snodaigh
Leader of the Labour Party: Brendan Howlin
Leader of the Green Party: Eamon Ryan
Leader of the Social Democrats: Catherine Murphy & Róisín Shortall

Oireachtas Committees

List of TDs  
This is a list of TDs elected to Dáil Éireann in the 2016 general election. The Changes table below records changes in membership and party affiliation.

Technical groups
In the wake of the 2016 general election, which saw a significant increase in the number of TDs elected as independents or from small parties in the 32nd Dáil, the Dáil standing orders were extensively revised to reduce the minimum number for formation of a technical group from seven TDs to five, and to allow multiple technical groups to exist in parallel. In January 2018, there were three groups; Independents 4 Change Group (7), Social Democrats–Green Party Group (5) and the Rural Independents Group (7).

Independents 4 Change Group

Social Democrats–Green Party Group

Rural Independents Group

Outgoing Senators elected to Dáil

Senators elected to the Dáil left their Seanad seats vacant for the remaining weeks of the 24th Seanad.
 Thomas Byrne (FF) (previously a TD from 2007 to 2011)
 David Cullinane (SF)
 Michael W. D'Arcy (FG) (previously a TD from 2007 to 2011)
 Marc MacSharry (FF)
 Hildegarde Naughton (FG)
 Darragh O'Brien (FF) (previously a TD from 2007 to 2011)
 Katherine Zappone (Ind)

Firsts
For the first time, two siblings were elected to Dáil Éireann from the same constituency: Michael and Danny Healy-Rae for Kerry.

Having become the first openly lesbian member of the Oireachtas and the first member in a recognised same-sex relationship with her Seanad nomination in 2011, Katherine Zappone also became the first openly lesbian Teachta Dála (TD) after being elected to the Dáil in 2016, and later the first openly lesbian member of government.

Independents 4 Change, the Social Democrats and Aontú had their first TDs.

On 14 June 2017 Leo Varadkar became the first openly gay Taoiseach.

Malcolm Byrne became the first openly gay man to win a by-election, and the first openly gay Fianna Fáil TD.

Changes

See also
Government of the 32nd Dáil
Members of the 25th Seanad
Dáil constituencies

Footnotes

References

 
32nd Dáil
2016 in the Republic of Ireland
32